This is a list of flags used in the Maldives. For more information about the national flag, see flag of Maldives.

National flag

Governmental flag

Military flags

Historical flags

See also 

 Flag of Maldives
 Emblem of Maldives

References 

Maldives
Flags